The Sauber C9 (later named the Sauber Mercedes C9 or Mercedes-Benz C9) is a Group C prototype race car introduced in 1987 as a continuation of the partnership between Sauber as a constructor and Mercedes-Benz as an engine builder for the World Sportscar Championship. The C9 replaced the Sauber C8.

Development
The C9 was a development of Sauber's previous C8 design, retaining a monocoque that largely consisted of aluminium, although considerably stiffer and with numerous other improvements. The rear suspension changed from vertically positioned spring/damper units arranged over the top of the gearbox to a horizontal layout aligned with the longitudinal axis of the car. Aerodynamic changes included the repositioning of the combination  of oil/water radiator to the nose of the car, which allowed the use of a modified splitter plate. Commensurate with the repositioning of the radiators, the large NACA ducts were removed from the top of the door sills. The rear deck had been considerably re-profiled and the rear wing was now mounted solely on a central support. Aerodynamically, the car had two configurations: one for sprint circuits and a low drag version for the 5.8 kilometre Mulsanne Straight at Le Mans. In its sprint configuration, it produced  of downforce at 320 km/h (200 mph) while generating  of drag. The sprint circuit configuration had a L/D ratio of 4:1 while the low drag version was around 3:1. The early engines were again prepared by Swiss engine specialist, Heini Mader, though this is now known to have been a cover for Mercedes back door involvement with the project later on. It had been progressively lightened with the use of a new crankshaft, higher efficiency KKK turbochargers and a liner-less block. It was a semi-stressed part of the chassis and ran a dry sump. There were no special qualifying engines and on 2.2 bar of boost it was said to be rated at "almost ". Maximum race boost was 1.9 bar. Maximum RPM was 7,000 but drivers generally kept to 6,500 during races. The torque curve was almost uniform between 3,000 and 6,000 rpm, giving the engine plenty of flexibility. The engine retained a cross plane crankshaft and the firing order was 1-5-4-8-6-3-7-2. Later M119HL engines were sourced from the Mercedes engine facility at Untertürkheim, supervised by Hermann Hiereth.

History
For its debut season in 1987, the cars were run by Kouros Racing, named after the fragrance brand of its parent company, Yves Saint Laurent, although backed by Mercedes-Benz in a semi-official capacity. The deal was to last five races. The team managed a mere twelfth in the teams standings, scoring points in only a single round. For 1988, the sponsorship deal with Kouros was not renewed and the team was renamed Sauber Mercedes. This coincided with a change of senior management at Mercedes and the announcement in January by new deputy chairman Prof. Dr Werner Niefer that the company would support Group C sportscars.  As a result, Mercedes was sponsored by AEG-Olympia – AEG being owned by Daimler-Benz at the time, effectively giving the team full factory support. The team's management was bolstered by former BMW M team manager Jochen Neerpasch and Swiss former driver Max Welti. They managed to finish second in the championship behind the Jaguar XJR-9 with five wins for the season.  Unfortunately at the 24 Hours of Le Mans, the team suffered an embarrassing setback when they were forced to withdraw due to concern over their Michelin tyres after Klaus Niedzwiedz suffered a blow out at high speed.

Finally, in 1989, the car was able to achieve great success. Besides replacing the black colour scheme with Mercedes' traditional plain silver scheme and reducing AEG to the role of minor sponsor, the older M117 5.0 L turbocharged V8 engine was upgraded to the M119, which replaced steel heads with new four-valve aluminium heads. The engine had a Group C capacity equivalence of 8.454 litres. The C9 was able to win all but one race in the 1989 season, including the 24 Hours of Le Mans. During qualifying, the Baldi/Acheson/Brancatelli C9 recorded a speed of 400 km/h (248 mph) on the Mulsanne Straight. In spite of this, it was the car of Schlesser/Jabouille/Cudini which occupied pole position on race day. The Sauber C9s would go on to finish first, second and fifth in the race. Mercedes driver Jean-Louis Schlesser would end up taking the driver's championship that season.

The C9 would be replaced by the Mercedes-Benz C11 from the second race onwards of the 1990 season, when it took one final win in the first race.

Achievements 
The Sauber C9 did not enjoy a lot of success in 1987, its first season, finishing on only three occasions. The car's speed potential was made clear when Johnny Dumfries set a lap record at Le Mans before retiring with gearbox failure. Mike Thackwell also took pole position at Spa.  Schlesser won the final race of the year, the non-championship Nurburgring Supercup, which was the only win in an otherwise bleak season for the Swiss-German team.

The C9 won five races in the 1988 World Sportscar Championship, showing much-improved reliability and placing second in the overall standings behind the winning Silk Cut Jaguar team. Drivers Schlesser, Baldi and Mass finished second, third and fifth respectively behind Jaguar's Martin Brundle in the driver's championship. In the 1989 World Sportscar Championship, the Sauber C9 won all except the second race at Dijon Prenois, where they were defeated by the Joest Porsche 962 of Bob Wollek and Frank Jelinski. Sauber drivers also filled the top four spots in the drivers standings with Schlesser winning the championship outright. High performance was only one notable aspect of the C9s ability; its reliability was another. The car failed to finish only twice in the 1989 season but on both occasions, the race was won by the other team car.

Reaching 400 km/h (248.0 mph) during the qualifying sessions of the 1989 24 Hours of Le Mans, the Sauber C9 proved to have one of the highest top speeds in the history of the competition at Le Mans. The C9's mark was only exceeded by the WM Peugeot P88, which achieved a speed of 405 km/h (251.1 mph) in the 1988 race. These speeds led to the introduction of two chicanes on the Mulsanne Straight from 1990 onwards.

Complete World Sportscar Championship results

 Points also scored by the Sauber C11

Gallery

See also
Mercedes-Benz motorsport

References

Notes

Bibliography

External links

Sauber F1 Team – corporate history

Group C cars
24 Hours of Le Mans race cars
Le Mans winning cars
Sauber Motorsport
Mercedes-Benz vehicles